Moraine Cove is a small cove at the north end of Mikkelsen Bay along the west coast of Graham Land, Antarctica. A moraine descends to the cove from the southwest end of Pavie Ridge. The name derives from the provisional name "Moraine Point," used by Professor Robert L. Nichols of the Ronne Antarctic Research Expedition, who examined the geology of this area in 1947. The name Moraine Cove retains the spirit of the naming by Nichols, and is considered more essential for reference purposes than a name for the moraine itself.

References

Coves of Graham Land
Fallières Coast